Hira Mondal (born 31 August 1996) is an Indian professional footballer who plays as a defender for Indian Super League club NorthEast United. He has also represented West Bengal in the Santosh Trophy.

Club career

Bengaluru
In July 2022, Mondal penned a two-year deal with Indian Super League club Bengaluru. On 17 August, he was sent-off on his debut against Jamshedpur in the Durand Cup, in a 2–1 win.

Career statistics

Club

Honours

East Bengal reserves
 GTA Governor's Gold Cup: 2018

Mohammedan Sporting
 I-League 2nd Division: 2019–20

Bengaluru
 Durand Cup: 2022

References

Living people
1993 births
Indian footballers
Footballers from Kolkata
Association football defenders
East Bengal Club players
Bengaluru FC players
Mohammedan SC (Kolkata) players
Tollygunge Agragami FC players
Peerless SC players